Also called “Haas Award” is an award from the University of California at Berkeley established in 1964 by Walter A. Haas Jr., Peter E. Haas and Richard Goldman. It recognizes students or alumni of the University who are from a different country to the United States who have made significant contributions to their country.

The award winners have been:

References

External links 
 Haas Awards
 The Elise and Walter A. Haas International Award
 University of California, Berkeley Official Website

University of California, Berkeley
University of California, Berkeley people